"Aut inveniam viam aut faciam" (or "Aut viam inveniam aut faciam") is Latin for "I shall either find a way or make one."
The first word "aut" may be omitted, corresponding to omitting the English word "either" from the translation.

The phrase has been attributed to Hannibal; when his generals told him it was impossible to cross the Alps by elephant, this was supposedly his response. The first part of the sentence, "inveniam viam", "I shall find a way," also appears in other contexts in the tragedies of Seneca, spoken by Hercules and by Oedipus, and in Seneca's Hercules Furens (Act II, Scene 1, line 276) the whole sentence appears, in third person: "inveniet viam, aut faciet."

  
It has been used as a motto for instance by Francis Bacon as well as Robert Peary. It still is  popular in social, educational and military organisations.

In first person plural, the quote is written on an iron arch over the class of 1893 memorial gate at the University of Pennsylvania. A painting in the National Portrait Gallery, formerly attributed as Sir Philip Sidney and now thought to depict his brother Robert, is adorned with the phrase.
In The Dunciad, Alexander Pope writes of John Henley that he "turned his rhetoric to buffoonry" by handing out medallions engraved with this motto.

References

Latin words and phrases
Latin mottos